The 2022 Copa Sevilla was a professional tennis tournament played on clay courts. It was the 24th edition of the tournament which was part of the 2022 ATP Challenger Tour. It took place in Seville, Spain between 5 and 10 September 2022.

Singles main-draw entrants

Seeds

 1 Rankings are as of 29 August 2022.

Other entrants
The following players received wildcards into the singles main draw:
  Javier Barranco Cosano
  Jerzy Janowicz
  Carlos López Montagud

The following player received entry into the singles main draw as a special exempt:
  Kimmer Coppejans

The following players received entry into the singles main draw as alternates:
  Frederico Ferreira Silva
  Lorenzo Giustino
  Timofey Skatov

The following players received entry from the qualifying draw:
  Bogdan Bobrov
  Viktor Durasovic
  Giovanni Fonio
  Filip Cristian Jianu
  Daniel Mérida
  Nicolas Moreno de Alboran

Champions

Singles

 Roberto Carballés Baena def.  Bernabé Zapata Miralles 6–3, 7–6(8–6).

Doubles

 Román Andrés Burruchaga /  Facundo Díaz Acosta def.  Nicolás Álvarez Varona /  Alberto Barroso Campos 7–5, 6–7(8–10), [10–7].

References

2022
2022 ATP Challenger Tour
2022 in Spanish tennis
September 2022 sports events in Spain